Sir James Blacklock Henderson GCVO (5 March 1871 – 7 April 1950) was a Scottish inventor, naval architect, and professor of applied mechanics.

Born the eldest son of James Henderson, headmaster of Whitehall School, Glasgow, James B. Henderson was educated by his father and at Allan Glen's School in Glasgow and then at the University of Glasgow and the University of Berlin. 

From 1894 to 1898, he was a lecturer in physics at Yorkshire College, Leeds. From 1898 to 1901, he was head of the scientific department at Barr and Stroud, Glasgow. In 1898, he married Annie Margaret Henderson.

From 1901 to 1905, he was a lecturer on electrical engineering and a university assistant in engineering at Glasgow University. In 1905, he was appointed a Professor of Applied Mechanics at the Royal Naval College, Greenwich. He was the author of many scientific papers published in the Proceedings of the Royal Society and several other academic journals. 

His knighthood was announced on 1 January 1920 and conferred at Buckingham Palace on 25 June 1920. He was an Invited Speaker of the ICM in 1924 at Toronto.

In 1928, Henderson was nominated a member of the Second Class of The Order of the Sacred Treasure of Japan for his part in training Japanese naval officers at Greenwich. This was noted in 'The Collected Papers of William Burnside Vol 1., who was nominated at the same time.

References

External links
Sir James Blacklock Henderson (1871–1950), Professor of Applied Mathematics, National Portrait Gallery

1871 births
British naval architects
1950 deaths
19th-century British engineers
20th-century British engineers
Knights Grand Cross of the Royal Victorian Order
Knights Bachelor
Recipients of the Order of the Sacred Treasure